The Jeffair Barracuda is a high-performance sporting monoplane that was developed in the United States in the 1970s and is marketed for homebuilding. Designed and built by Geoffrey Siers, the prototype won the prize for "Most Outstanding New Design" at the EAA Fly-in in 1976. It was a low-wing cantilever monoplane of wooden construction with retractable tricycle undercarriage and side-by-side seating for two. Around 150 sets of plans had sold by 1977.

Development
Geoffrey Siers was a former RAF pilot and engineer for Boeing in 1967. He set out to design an aircraft that was fast, aerobatic, two place, and had range to fly long cross-country flights. The aircraft was refined after a full size cockpit mockup was made. The lightweight construction of the plywood-covered wooden de Havilland Mosquito was the inspiration for the materials choice. The retractable landing gear came from a Piper PA-24 Comanche. The wings were a three-piece design

Operational history
Test flights were performed in 1975.

Specifications

References

 
 
 
 Archived copy of Siersflight website

1970s United States sport aircraft
Homebuilt aircraft
Low-wing aircraft
Single-engined tractor aircraft
Aircraft first flown in 1975